Muhammed Alperen Uysal (born 1 January 1994) is a Turkish professional footballer who plays as a goalkeeper for Turkish Süper Lig club Antalyaspor.

Senior career 
Uysal made his professional debut for Gaziantepspor in a 4-0 loss to Beşiktaş 2 April 2016.

References

External links 

 
 
 
 

1994 births
Living people
Sportspeople from Balıkesir
Turkish footballers
Turkey youth international footballers
Turkey under-21 international footballers
Galatasaray S.K. footballers
Gaziantepspor footballers
Çaykur Rizespor footballers
Antalyaspor footballers
Süper Lig players
Association football goalkeepers